Secret Scandal is a 1989 Italian film which was written and directed by Monica Vitti. It starred Vitti in the lead role, Elliott Gould, Gino Pernice, and Catherine Spaak. It was screened in the Un Certain Regard section at the 1990 Cannes Film Festival.

For the movie, Monica Vitti made her debut as a director. Nevertheless, it would be her last appearance on the big screen before her death in 2022.

Synopsis
On her birthday, Margherita (Monica Vitti) receives a video camera from a friend, who is a film director (Elliott Gould). She decides to use the device to keep a diary of her life. As the camera is capable of recording automatically, snippets usually feature her talking. However, on one occasion, Margherita leaves the camera in her bedroom as it was still recording; it catches Margherita's husband, Paolo (Gino Pernice), who has always had a distant demeanor to her, as he cheats on her with her best friend (Catherine Spaak). A secret scandal ensues in their separation with Paolo's departure and Margherita going into a deep depression, even to the point of contemplating suicide. Her friend, the director who gave her the camera, examines the film, and concludes that it is interesting material for an actual movie.

Cast
 Monica Vitti
 Elliott Gould
 Gino Pernice
 Catherine Spaak
 Carmen Onorati
 Pietro De Vico
 Donatella Gambini
 Daniele Stroppa
 Gianni Olivieri
 Daniela Rindi

Awards
 1990 David di Donatello award for Best new director: Monica Vitti

References

External links

1989 films
1989 drama films
Italian drama films
1980s Italian-language films
Films directed by Monica Vitti
1980s Italian films